Mariano Rossi (7 December 1731 - 24 October 1807) was an Italian painter, persisting in what had become an anachronistic Rococo style amid an ascendant neoclassical environment. His placement legions of figures in a complex scenography and quadrature recalls the work of Pietro da Cortona.

Biography
Mariano was born to poor parents in Sciacca, Sicily. He trained first in Palermo, then in Naples, and finally in Rome, where he studied under Marco Benefial. He was patronized by the illuminated charity of men of fashion (that is, wealthy individuals)

He was paid 400 zecchini by the Cardinal Cardinal Bernis for a canvas depicting Joshua commanding Sun to stand still. He painted for the churches of Purgatorio and Santa Lucia in Sciacca, Sicily. In 1766, he was called to paint frescoes for the royal court in Turin.

He then returned to Rome, where he painted a fresco in the grand salon of the Villa Borghese. During 1775-1779, he painted a large ceiling fresco depicting Marcus Furius Camillus Fighting Brennus and his Gauls, while Romulus Entreats Jupiter to Help Rome. The room displays some of the ancient Roman statuary, previously collected by Camillo Borghese. Other contemporary painters active in the Villa were Laurent Pecheux and Domenico de Angelis. Mariano joined the Academy of St Luke in 1776.

Moving to Campania, he painted a Marriage of Alexander the Great to Roxana. He painted a Ovid writing Ars Amatoria for Paul I, Tsar of Russia.

The Napoleonic invasion of Rome caused him to leave for Sicily. There he painted a Roger I Liberating of Sicily from the Saracens for the Palermo Cathedral. With the Bourbon restoration in Naples, he briefly painted again at the Palace of Caserta. But moving back to Rome in 1804, he died. He was buried in the church of Santa Susanna, Rome.

Other works

Works by Rossi were made for:
Pope Honorius for the Santa Maria in Ara Coeli, Rome 
Paintings in San Giuseppe alla Lungara, Rome
Adoration of the Magi and Conversation of Peter and Paul Galleria Nazionale d'Arte Antica, Palazzo Barberini, Rome
Duomo of Palermo
San Benedetto, Palermo
San Martino for PP. Cassinesi, Palermo 
Sant'Agata, Catania 
Family of Darius before Alexander, Cleopatra, and a Holy Family for Marchese San Giacomo, Sciacca
Sacrifice of Abraham, Agar and Ishmael, Moses, and a Deposition for Baron Consiglio, Sciacca
Landscape with Agar, Joshua, and Alexander for Signor Rosa, Sciacca
Alexander the Great's marriage with Roxana, Royal Palace of Caserta, Caserta

Sources
Nuova enciclopedia italiana, 6th Edition by Gerolamo Boccardo (1885), page 721. quoting
Giuseppe Vento, Elogio biografico di Mariano Bossi (Palermo 1864).

References

1731 births
1807 deaths
People from Sciacca
18th-century Italian painters
Italian male painters
19th-century Italian painters
Italian neoclassical painters
Painters from Palermo
19th-century Italian male artists
18th-century Italian male artists